Friederike von Reden (1774-1854), was a German noblewoman, philanthropist and salon-holder. She is known as the Mutter des Hirschberger Tales.

Early life 
She was born as the daughter of Baron Friedrich Adolf Richard Riedesel zu Eisenbach (1738-1800) and his wife, Friederike Charlotte Louise von Massow (1746-1808).

Biography 
She married minister Friedrich Wilhelm von Reden in 1802. After being widowed in 1815, she became a significant philanthropist. She founded the bible society Buchwalder Bibelgesellschaft, whose president she was. She founded a number of charitable societies active in Silesia. She also hosted a literary salon in her home, which became a center of the Silesian aristocracy.

References

kulturportal-west-ost.eu

External links

1774 births
1854 deaths
18th-century German people
German salon-holders
German philanthropists
German women philanthropists